Barillari is a surname. Notable people with the surname include:

Al Barillari (1917–2007), American baseball pitcher, manager, and scout
Alexandre Barillari (born 1975), Brazilian actor
Rino Barillari (born 1945), Italian photographer

Italian-language surnames